Matt Reid and Sergiy Stakhovsky were the defending champions but chose not to defend their title.

André Göransson and Sem Verbeek won the title after defeating Sander Arends and David Pel 7–6(8–6), 4–6, [11–9] in the final.

Seeds

Draw

References

External links
 Main draw

Cassis Open Provence - Doubles